The  were a class of rescue ship/tugboat of the Imperial Japanese Navy (IJN), serving during World War II. The  was a wartime variant which introduced measures to simplify production.

Background
After the Russo-Japanese War, the IJN purchased many steamships and converted them to salvage vessels. However, by the beginning of the 1930s, replacements were needed, to this end the IJN introduced the Tategami-class.

Ships in classes

Tategami class
The IJN was going to build the Tategami class one by one for three years from fiscal year 1936, at first. However, the plan came to a deadlock for budget shortage by the second year. The IJN postponed building of second ship Oshima for two years.

Miura class
To simplify and speed-up construction of the Tategami class, the Kampon introduced wartime standard ship structures into the Tategami design.

Footnotes

Bibliography 
The Maru Special, Japanese Naval Vessels No. 53, Japanese support vessels,  (Japan), July 1981
Editorial Committee of the Navy, Navy Vol. 11, "Part of small vessels, auxiliary vessels, miscellaneous service ships and converted merchant ships", Seibunsha K.K. (Japan), August 1981
30 year History of Japan Maritime Safety Agency, Policy and Legal Affairs Division-Japan Maritime Safety Agency (JMSA), May 1979
50 year History of Harima Zōsen, Harima Zōsen Corporation, November 1960
75 year History of Mitsubishi Heavy Industries-Shimonoseki shipyard, Mitsubishi Heavy Industries-Shimonoseki shipyard, 1964
Monthly Ships of the World No. 613, Special issue Vol. 62 "All ships of Japan Coast Guard 1948–2003", (Japan), July 2003
Jirō Kimata, Introductory book of the Japanese small vessels, Kōjinsha (Japan), December 1999
Shizuo Fukui
Japanese Naval Vessels Survived "Their post-war activities and final disposition", Shuppan Kyodosha (Japan), May 1961
FUKUI SHIZUO COLLECTION "Japanese Naval Vessels 1869–1945", KK Bestsellers (Japan), December 1994
, National Archives of Japan
Reference code: C05034279700, No. 35, 1935 March 13 Staff for construction of the tug boat and salvage boat
Reference code: C05034885500, May 1936 Instructions for Production of Electric Equipment for 800-ton Type Steel Salvage Tug Boat (1)
Reference code: C05034885600, May 1936 Instructions for Production of Electric Equipment for 800-ton Type Steel Salvage Tug Boat (2)
Reference code: C05034940200, Fleet Activity Command No.6084 May 21, 1936 Newly Constructed Factotum Vessels by Fiscal Year 1936 Provisional Factotum Vessels Production Fee
Reference code: C05110830400, [Data in English is under preparation] 官房３０６号 １２．１．２２ 雑役船の公称番号及船種変更の件
Reference code: C08030664200, Detailed engagement report and wartime log book from October 1, 1943 to February 5, 1944, Special Service Vessel Hakkai-Maru (1)

World War II naval ships of Japan
Patrol vessels of the Japan Coast Guard
Naval ships of Thailand
Auxiliary tugboat classes